This is a list of notable people from Fremantle, Western Australia.  They may have been born there or have been resident there at some time.

A
William Angwin (1863–1944), politician; Deputy Premier of Western Australia
Tahnee Atkinson (1992–), model; winner of the fifth cycle of Australia's Next Top Model

B
Craig Barnett (1974–), model; crowned Mr Australia in 2007
Bill Bateman (1866–1935), Australian rules footballer and cricketer; inaugural captain of the Fremantle Football Club
 Tom Bateman (1922-2003), politician
Walter Bateman (1826–1882), merchant; member of the Western Australian Legislative Council
Neville Beard (1936–), Australian rules footballer; Sandover Medal winner
Kim Edward Beazley (1917–2007), politician; served as Father of the House in the Whitlam Government
K. A. Bedford (1963–), science fiction novelist; two-time Aurealis Award winner
Marcus Beilby (1951–), artist; Sulman Prize winner for his 1987 work Crutching the Ewes (homage to Shearing the Rams)
Phillip Bennett (1928–), General; served as Chief of the Australian Defence Force and Governor of Tasmania
Trevor Bickle (1943–), pole vaulter; won gold at the 1962 and 1966 Commonwealth Games
Emma Booth (1982–), actress and model; starred in the television series Cloudstreet and Underbelly: The Golden Mile
Ron Bowe (1939–), Australian rules footballer and cricketer
Ernest Bromley (1912–1967), cricketer; first Western Australian to play test cricket for Australia
John Butler (1975–), musician; frontman of roots and jam band the John Butler Trio

C
Martyn P. Casey (1960–), musician; bassist of The Triffids, Nick Cave and the Bad Seeds and Grinderman
Martin Cattalini (1973–), basketball player; played for the Perth Wildcats and Adelaide 36ers in the NBL
Fred Chaney, Sr. (1914–2001), politician
James Condon (1923–2014), actor
Robin Corbett, Baron Corbett of Castle Vale (1933–2012), politician

D

 Arthur Davies
 Edward William Davies
Jordi Davieson (1993–) lead singer and guitarist of the indie pop band San Cisco
Jack Davis (1917–2000), playwright and poet; referred to as the 20th century's Aboriginal Poet Laureate
Charles Dempster (1839–1907), politician
Archer Denness (1914–1997), soldier
Natalie D-Napoleon (1972–), singer-songwriter
George Doig (1913–2006), Australian rules footballer; Australian Football Hall of Fame inductee
Brett Dorey (1977–), cricketer
Jon Dorotich (1962–), Australian rules footballer
Kenneth Charles Duncan (1898-1983), Modernist architect and first West Australian Federal President of the Royal Australian Institute of Architects
Ross Dunkerton (1945–), rally driver; five-time Australian Rally Championship winner

E

Hughie Edwards (1914–1982), military pilot and politician; most highly decorated Australian serviceman of World War II
Ringer Edwards (1913–2000), soldier; basis for the character Jean Paget in Nevil Shute's 1950 novel A Town Like Alice
 Ben Elton
Bob Evans (1976–), musician; lead singer and guitarist of the alternative rock band Jebediah

F
Graham Farmer (1935–2019), Australian rules footballer; first Australian footballer to receive a Queen's honour (MBE, 1971) 
John Fischer (1947–), politician
 Robert Fletcher
David Francisco (1841–1888), explorer; member of the La Grange expedition
David Franklin (1962–), actor; starred in the television series Farscape and Xena: Warrior Princess

G
Anna Gare (1969–), musician and television personality
Alex George (1939–), botanist; authority on the plant genera Banksia and Dryandra
David Gibson (1967–), politician; Queensland's Minister for Police and Community Safety
Brian Greig (1966–), politician
George Grljusich (1939–2007), Australian rules footballer and journalist

H

John Halden (1954–), politician; member of the Western Australian Legislative Council
Paul Hasluck (1905–1993), historian, poet and politician; 17th Governor-General of Australia
 Kevin Healy
William Heseltine (1930–), civil servant; former Private Secretary to Queen Elizabeth II
Edward Higham (1846–1885), politician; member of the Western Australian Legislative Council
 John Higham
Russell Hobby (1933–), fencer; competed at the 1964 and 1968 Summer Olympics
 David Holmgren
Ralph Honner (1904–1994), soldier; commander of the 39th and 2/14th Battalions in World War II
Rusty Hopkinson (1964–), musician; drummer of the alternative rock band You Am I
 John Hughes

I
Alex Isle (1963–), author

J
Glen Jakovich (1973–), Australian rules footballer; Australian Football Hall of Fame inductee 
Carlisle Jarvis (1906–1979), Australian rules footballer
Frank Jenkins (1918–1987), Australian rules footballer
Courtney Johns (1984–), Australian rules footballer
David Jones (1955–), football (soccer) player

K
Samantha Kerr (1993–), football (soccer) player; midfielder for Australia national women's football team (the Matildas)
Theo Koning (born 1950 in the Netherlands) is a Western Australian painter, sculptor, printmaker and art teacher. Theo Koning's works have gained extensive representation in art galleries throughout Australia, including the National Gallery of Australia.[5][6][7]

L
Simone Lazaroo (1961–), author
William T. Leighton (1905–1990), architect
Ewen Leslie (1980–), actor
 Edgar Lewis
 William Lewis
Joan London (1948–), author
Luc Longley (1969–), basketball player; first Australian to play in the NBA
Vince Lovegrove (1948–2012), journalist and musician; member of The Valentines and manager of rock group Divinyls
 Niall Lucy
Simon Lyndon (1971–), actor; AFI award winner for his role in the 2000 film Chopper

M
Stuart MaCleod (1977–), musician; guitarist of the alternative rock band Eskimo Joe
Dee Margetts (1955–), politician; Greens representative in the Australian Senate
William Marmion (1845–1896), politician; member of the Western Australian Legislative Council
 Denis Marshall
Bill Mather-Brown (1936–), Paralympic table tennis player
 Isabel McBryde
John McGrath (1947–), politician
 William Albany McKenzie
Paul Mercurio (1963–), dancer and actor; star of the 1992 film Strictly Ballroom
 Haviland Le Mesurier
J. J. Miller (1933–), jockey and horse trainer
Newton Moore (1870–1936), politician; 8th Premier of Western Australia
Sally Morgan (1951–), artist and author

N
Bernie Naylor (1923–1993), Australian rules footballer; West Australian Football Hall of Fame inductee
Tim Neesham (1979–), water polo player; competed at the 2000 and 2004 Summer Olympics
 Brad Ness
Paul Nicholls (1946–2009), Australian rules footballer and cricketer

P
Kevin Parker (1986–), musician; frontman of psychedelic rock band Tame Impala
 William Silas Pearse
Michael Petkovic (1976–), football (soccer) player; goalkeeper for Melbourne Victory
Andy Petterson (1969–), football (soccer) player
 Billie Pitcheneder
Spike Pola (1914–2012), Australian rules footballer
Alan Preen (1935–), Australian rules footballer and cricketer

Q

R
 Alan Rawlinson
 Kate Raynes-Goldie

S

Frederick Samson (1892–1974), businessman and politician; long-term Mayor of Fremantle
Lionel Samson (1799–1879), businessman; founder of Lionel Samson & Son, Australia's oldest continuing family business
Bon Scott (1946–1980), musician; lead singer of the hard rock band AC/DC
Kim Scott (1957–), novelist; two-time Miles Franklin Award winner
George Seddon (1927–2007), academic; popularised the phrase sense of place in his 1972 book of the same name
Alan Seymour (1927–), author and playwright; writer of the 1958 play The One Day of the Year
Jack Sheedy (1926–), Australian rules footballer; Australian Football Hall of Fame inductee
Craig Silvey (1982–), novelist and musician; author of the 2009 novel Jasper Jones
Jon Sivewright (1965–), actor; starred in the television series Home and Away
 Billy Smith
Trevor Sprigg (1946–2008), Australian rules footballer and politician
 Bill Stephen
 Patrick Stone
 Harry Strickland
 Herbert Styants
Peter Sumich (1968–), Australian rules footballer

T

Peter Tagliaferri (1960–), politician; Mayor of Fremantle
Shaun Tan (1974–), illustrator and author
Kavyen Temperley (1978–), musician; lead singer and bassist of the alternative rock band Eskimo Joe
Carus Thompson (1976–), musician; frontman of the roots and folk band Carus and The True Believers
 Ron Thompson
Frank Treasure (1925–1998), Australian rules footballer; West Australian Football Hall of Fame inductee

U

V

W
 Jay Watson (1990–), multi-instrumentalist and psychedelic rock musician
 Scott Watters (1969–), Australian rules footballer; ex coach of the St Kilda Football Club
 David Whish-Wilson (1966–), author
 Aaron Whitchurch
 Laurie Wilkinson
 Daryl Williams (1942–), politician
 Dixie Willis (1941–), runner; won gold at the 1962 Commonwealth Games, breaking the 800 metres world record
 Tim Winton (1960–), author; four-time Miles Franklin Award winner
 Edward Wittenoom (1854–1936), politician
 Barrington Wood
 Garnet Wood
 Graeme Wood (1956–), Australian rules footballer and cricketer
 Kevin Wright (1953–), cricketer

X

Y
Henry Yelverton (1854–1906), politician; member of the Western Australian Legislative Council

Z
Carla Zampatti (1942–2021), fashion designer; emigrated to Fremantle from Italy in 1950

See also
List of Australians

References

Fremantle
 
Fremantle